Sofia Church, named for Swedish queen Sophia of Nassau, is in Stockholm, Sweden.

Sofia Church may also refer to:

 Sofia Church, Jönköping, named for Sofia-Järstorp Parish, in Jönköping, Sweden
 Sofia Albertina Church, named for Sophia Albertina, in Landskrona, Scania, Sweden
 Saint Sophia Church (disambiguation)

See also 
 List of churches dedicated to Holy Wisdom
 Sophia of Rome#Churches, for churches named after Saint Sophia of Rome
 Hagia Sophia (disambiguation)
 Ascension Cathedral (Sophia, Pushkin), Russia
 Sophienkirche (disambiguation)
 Saint Sophia Church (disambiguation)